The Sanctuary Way Walk is a  circular walk around the city of Ripon in North Yorkshire. The walk traces a route around the city and has eight trail points at the places where waymarkers used to designate that travellers were within  of the cathedral at Ripon and thus afforded The Sanctuary of Ripon. The waymarker at Sharow is the base of one of the crosses that used to mark the edge of the Sanctuary of Ripon.

History
In 937, King Athelstan created the Sanctuary of Ripon by placing eight crosses on the roads approaching the city. Some of the crosses were given names; Cross of Athelstan, Kangel Cross and Sharow Cross. The sanctuary was known as the Liberty of St Wilfrid and was maintained by the ecclesiastical body in the city. The boundary waymarkers have all since been removed or destroyed except the remnants of the base of one of the crosses at Sharow, which is now a listed monument. The sanctuary lasted until 1540 when the authorities looking after law and order became secular.

The routes
The path was created in 2004 by the Rotary Club of Ripon and the Rotary Club of Ripon Rowels who designed it as a celebration of the Rotary Club's 100-year anniversary of 2005. There are actually three walks which take two, three and four hours respectively, with each being longer in length than the previous one.
The Red Route runs from Bridge Hewick to the cathedral in Ripon via North Bridge and is listed as being the most scenic part of the route.
The Green Route has the same starting point as the Red Route but ventures further north before turning back by the golf club and finishing at the cathedral.
The Blue Route is the full  which starts at Bridge Hewick east of the city and goes in a circular anti-clockwise direction around the city to finish at Gallows Hill just south of the cathedral.

Notes

References

External links
Sanctuary Way Walk PDF leaflet

Ripon
Footpaths in North Yorkshire